Roy L. Pierce was an American football and basketball coach.  He was the 21st head football coach at Doane College in Crete, Nebraska, serving for five seasons, from 1928 to 1932, and compiling a record of 18–16–3.  Pierce was also the head basketball coach at Doane from 1928 to 1933.

Head coaching record

Football

References

Year of birth missing
Year of death missing
Doane Tigers football coaches
Doane Tigers men's basketball coaches